Alessandro Di Saluzzo (Turin, 12 October 1775 – Turin, 10 August 1851) was a Savoyard army officer and politician.

Biography
Alessandro Di Saluzzo di Monesiglio was born at Turin in 1775.

When he was very young he enrolled in the Royal Sardinian Army and he was employed in senior roles from the restoration in 1814, when he was part of the Regency Council, as a colonel. In the meantime, he married the noblewoman Maria Luisa Arborio Di Breme.

On 23 March 1819, he was assigned the role of Commandant-General of the Arma dei Carabinieri, a role which he retained until he was promoted to Major General and appointed First Secretary of State for War on 27 November 1820. Subsequently, he was envoy extraordinary and minister plenipotentiary to Russia (16 January 1822 - 22 June 1825). On 15 September 1831, he became a President of Section of the Council of State and a Minister of State.

On 3 April 1848 he was elected as a Senator of the Subalpine Senate.

He died in Turin on 10 August 1851.

External links

Alessandro Di Saluzzo di Monesiglio, in Treccani.it – Enciclopedie on line, Istituto dell'Enciclopedia Italiana, 15 March 2011.

Members of the Senate of the Kingdom of Sardinia
Italian commanders of the Napoleonic Wars
19th-century Italian politicians
1775 births
1851 deaths
Knights Grand Cross of the Order of Saints Maurice and Lazarus
Carabinieri